Jennifer Hopkins and Jelena Kostanić were the defending champions. Hopkins did not compete.

Sonya Jeyaseelan and Maja Matevžič won the title, defeating Laura Granville and Jelena Kostanić in the final, 6–4, 6–4.

Seeds

Draw

External links
 Draw (ITF) 

2003 Internationaux de Strasbourg Singles
2003 WTA Tour
2003 in French tennis